

Events

By place

Europe 
 April 21: Romulus and Remus legendarily found the city of Rome (according to the calculations of the Roman scholar Varro Reatinus). According to the legend, Romulus and Remus are the sons of Rhea Silvia, daughter of Numitor, king of Alba Longa, and descended from Aeneas. Alba Longa is an ancient Latin city, located in the Alban Hills in Central Italy. Before the birth of the twin brothers, Numitor is deposed by his younger brother, Amulius, who forces Rhea to become a vestal virgin, so that she will not give birth to rival claimants to his title. However, Rhea is impregnated (raped) by the war god Mars and gives birth to Romulus and Remus. Amulius orders the infants to be drowned in the Tiber River, but they survive and wash ashore at the foot of the Palatine Hill – where they are suckled by a she-wolf until they are found by the shepherd Faustulus. Reared by Faustulus and his wife, the twins later become leaders of a band of young shepherd warriors. After learning their true identity, they attack Alba Longa, killing the wicked Amulius, and restore their grandfather to the throne. The twins decide to found a town on the site where they had been saved as infants. Romulus and Remus soon become involved in a quarrel, however, Remus is slain by his brother. Romulus then becomes ruler of the settlement, which is named Rome after him. To populate his town, Romulus offers asylum to fugitives and exiles.

By topic

Chronology 
 Beginning of the Roman Ab urbe condita calendar.

References

750s BC